PT Suzuki Indomobil Motor (formerly PT Indomobil Suzuki International until December 2008) is a joint venture between Suzuki Motor Corporation and the Indomobil Group. The company is located in Jakarta, Indonesia and specializes in manufacturing Suzuki vehicles for the local market. A separate company, PT Suzuki Indomobil Sales (SIS), previously PT Indomobil Niaga International, handles sales and marketing of Suzuki automobiles and motorcycles.

Suzuki's first activities in the Indonesian market in 1970 were through its import firm PT Indohero Steel & Engineering Company. Six years later Suzuki built a manufacturing facility (in Jakarta) which is the oldest part of the Indomobil Group.

Suzuki's first product was the ST20 Carry (introduced in 1978), which saw extensive use as an Angkot. Nicknamed "Turungtung" (an onomatopoetic word for the sound made by the Carry's two-stroke engine), it was built until at least 1983.

In 2011, the company invested $800 million to produce the Low Cost Green Car (LCGC) in Indonesia. In 2015, Suzuki opened another plant in Cikarang with a total investment of $1 billion. The plant manufactured the Ertiga MPV for both domestic and export markets and the K10B engine for the Karimun Wagon R.

Current models

Manufactured locally

Tambun Plant 
Automobiles:
 Suzuki APV (2004–present)
 Suzuki Carry (2019–present)
Motorcycles:
 Suzuki Satria F150 (2007–present)
 Suzuki Nex 115 (2011–present)
 Suzuki Address 115 (2014–present)
 Suzuki GSX-R/S125 (2016–present, export only)
 Suzuki GSX-R/S150 (2016–present)

Cikarang Plant 
Automobiles:
 Suzuki Ertiga (2012–present)
 Suzuki XL7 (2020–present)

Imported 
Motorcycles:
 Suzuki Gixxer SF 250 (2021–present, India-sourced)
 Suzuki Avenis 125 (2022–present, India-sourced)
 Suzuki V-Strom SX 250 (2023–present, India-sourced)

Automobiles:
 Suzuki S-Cross (2016–present, India-sourced)
 Suzuki Ignis (2017–present, India-sourced)
 Suzuki Baleno (2017–present, India-sourced)
 Suzuki Jimny (2019–present, Japan-sourced)
 Suzuki S-Presso (2022–present, India-sourced) 
 Suzuki Grand Vitara (2023–present, India-sourced)

Former models

Manufactured locally 
Automobiles:
 Suzuki Karimun Wagon R (2013–2021)
 Suzuki Carry Futura (1991–2019)
 Suzuki Mega Carry (2011–2019 for domestic market, 2005–2019 for export markets)
 Mazda VX-1 (2013–2016)
 Suzuki SX4 (2008–2013)
 Suzuki Swift (2007–2012)
 Suzuki Grand Vitara (2006–2012)
 Suzuki Neo Baleno (2008–2011)
 Suzuki Carry 1.0 (1983–2010)
 Mitsubishi Maven (2005–2009)
 Suzuki Baleno (1996–2002)
 Suzuki Aerio/Baleno Next-G (2002–2007)
 Suzuki Escudo (1993–2007)
 Suzuki Grand Escudo XL-7 (2003–2006)
 Suzuki Karimun (1999–2006)
 Suzuki Katana (1988–2005)
 Suzuki Sidekick (1995–2001)
 Suzuki Esteem (1991–1996)
 Suzuki Vitara (1992–1995)
 Suzuki Jimny (1978–1993)
 Suzuki Amenity/Eleny (1989–1992)
 Suzuki Forsa (1986–1989)
 Suzuki Carry ST20 (1978–1983)
 Suzuki Fronte (1976)

Motorcycles:
 Suzuki A100 (1974–1999)
 Suzuki Arashi 125 (2006–2008)
 Suzuki FR70 (1974–1982)
 Suzuki FXR150 (2002–2003)
 Suzuki GP100 (1977–1983)
 Suzuki GP125 (1977–1984)
 Suzuki GSX150 Bandit (2018–2022)
 Suzuki GT100 (1975–1980s)
 Suzuki GT125 (1975–1980s)
 Suzuki Hayate 125 (2011–2017)
 Suzuki Let's 115 (2012–2014)
 Suzuki RC80 (1984–1986)
 Suzuki RC100 Bravo/Sprinter (1986–2002)
 Suzuki RC110 Crystal (1990–1995)
 Suzuki RG150 (1989–1997)
 Suzuki Satria F115 Young Star (2015–2016)
 Suzuki Satria RU120 (1997–2002)
 Suzuki Shogun 110 (1996–2004)
 Suzuki Shogun 125 (2004–2013)
 Suzuki Skydrive 125 (2009–2013)
 Suzuki Skywave 125 (2007–2011)
 Suzuki Smash 110 (2003–2013)
 Suzuki Smash 115 (2013–2021)
 Suzuki Spin 125 (2006–2011)
 Suzuki Thunder GSX250 (2003–2005)
 Suzuki Thunder EN125 (2004–2011)
 Suzuki Tornado 110 (1994–1997)
 Suzuki TRS 118 (1983–1994)
 Suzuki TRZ 125 Katana (1984–1987)
 Suzuki TS100 (1979–1980s)
 Suzuki TS125 (1994–2005)

Imported 
Automobiles:
 Suzuki Grand Vitara (2006 & 2012–2018, Japan-sourced)
 Suzuki Jimny (2017, Japan-sourced)
 Suzuki Ciaz (2015–2017, Thailand-sourced)
 Suzuki Celerio (2015–2017, Thailand-sourced)
 Suzuki Swift (2012–2017, Thailand-sourced)
 Suzuki Splash (2010–2016, India-sourced)
 Suzuki Swift Sport (2013–2014, Japan-sourced)
 Suzuki A-Star (2011–2012, India-sourced)
 Suzuki Karimun Estilo (2007–2012, India-sourced)
 Suzuki SX4 (2007–2008, Japan-sourced)
 Suzuki Neo Baleno (2007–2008, Japan-sourced)
 Suzuki Jimny Caribian (2005–2007, Thailand-sourced)
 Suzuki Swift (2005–2007, Japan-sourced)
 Suzuki Every Plus (2003–2004, Japan-sourced)
 Suzuki Swift (1984–1986, Japan-sourced)
 Suzuki Carry ST10 (1976, Japan-sourced)

Motorcycles:
 Suzuki Bandit 250 (early 2000s, Japan-sourced)
 Suzuki Burgman 200 (mid 2010s, Thailand-sourced)
 Suzuki DR200SE (2017–2019, Japan-sourced)
 Suzuki DR-Z400SM (mid 2010s, Japan-sourced)
 Suzuki FXR150 (2000–2002, Malaysia-sourced)
 Suzuki GSR750 (2014–2018, Japan-sourced)
 Suzuki GSX-R750 (early 2000s, Japan-sourced)
 Suzuki GSX-S1000F (2017–2018, Japan-sourced)
 Suzuki Hayabusa GSX1300R (early 2010s–2018, Japan-sourced)
 Suzuki GW250 Inazuma (2012–2016, China-sourced)
 Suzuki Raider 125 (early 2000s, Thailand-sourced)
 Suzuki Raider 150 (2003–2006, Thailand-sourced)
 Suzuki RK Cool 110 (early 2000s, Thailand-sourced)
 Suzuki Satria RU120 (2002–2005, Malaysia-sourced)
 Suzuki Thunder GSX250 (1999–2003, Japan-sourced)
 Suzuki V-Strom 650 (mid-2010s, Japan-sourced)

Slogans
Personal Best (1990–2005)
Way Of Life (2005–present)
Small Makes Big (2015)
Your Gear (2016–present)

References

External links
Official Suzuki Indonesia website

Car manufacturers of Indonesia
Indomobil
Manufacturing companies based in Jakarta
Vehicle manufacturing companies established in 1976
Indonesian companies established in 1976

de:IndoMobil Group#IndoMobil Suzuki International, PT.